The Spy Who Came in from the Cold is a 1963 Cold War spy novel by the British author John le Carré. It depicts Alec Leamas, a British agent, being sent to East Germany as a faux defector to sow disinformation about a powerful East German intelligence officer. It serves as a sequel to le Carré's previous novels Call for the Dead and A Murder of Quality, which also featured the fictitious British intelligence organization, "The Circus", and its agents George Smiley and Peter Guillam.

The Spy Who Came In from the Cold portrays Western espionage methods as morally inconsistent with Western democracy and values. The novel received critical acclaim at the time of its publication and became an international best-seller; it was selected as one of the All-Time 100 Novels by Time magazine.

In 1965, Martin Ritt directed a cinematic adaptation, with Richard Burton as Leamas.

Background
The Spy Who Came In from the Cold occurs during the heightened tensions that characterised the late 1950s and early 1960s Cold War, when a Warsaw Pact–NATO war sparked in Germany seemed likely. The story begins and concludes in Berlin, about a year after the completion of the Berlin Wall and around the time when double-agent Heinz Felfe was exposed and tried.

Le Carré's debut novel, Call for the Dead, introduced the characters George Smiley and Hans-Dieter Mundt. In that story, Smiley investigates the suicide of Samuel Fennan. He quickly establishes a link between the East German Secret Service and the deceased, and learns that Mundt, an assassin, killed the man after a misunderstanding between Fennan and their controller, Dieter Frey. Mundt escaped from England shortly after, getting back into East Germany before Smiley and Guillam could catch him. The Spy Who Came In from the Cold picks up two years later, where Mundt has had a somewhat meteoric rise to become the head of the Abteilung, because of his success with counter-intelligence operations against British networks, as well as a member of the Presidium of the Socialist Unity Party. Characters and events from The Spy Who Came In from the Cold are reinvestigated in A Legacy of Spies, le Carré's 2017 novel centering on an aging Guillam.

Le Carré was in part inspired by reading the translated novel The Darkroom of Damocles by Dutch writer Willem Frederik Hermans, who suspected plagiarism.

Plot
Alec Leamas, a former SOE operative during World War II who fought in the Nazi-occupied Netherlands and Norway, is recalled from his posting as Station Head of Berlin Station, West Berlin's operational branch of the Circus, and returns to London in despair after watching the death of his final undercover operative, Karl Riemeck, a member of the praesidium in East Germany's Socialist Unity Party, at the hands of Hans-Dieter Mundt. Mundt, formerly a lower level intelligence operative who is known to the Circus for his involvement in the murder of Foreign Office official Samuel Fennan a few years earlier, has risen to become the head of the East German Abteilung on account of his brilliant counter-intelligence aptitude, a skill demonstrated with his liquidation of Leamas' entire network. Finding himself with no operatives left, Leamas visits Circus chief Control and expresses a desire to get out of the intelligence community and "come in from the cold". Control asks him to instead stay "in the cold" for one last mission: defect to East Germany and frame Mundt as a double agent for SIS. Mundt's deputy, Jens Fiedler, Control explains, is beginning to believe that Mundt may be a turncoat, and could be a useful target for Leamas in this endeavour. In exchange for this, Leamas will keep anything he makes on the mission, in addition to a pension pot, and will be granted leave to retire from the service.

In order to convince the East Germans' of Leamas' potential defection, the Circus demotes Leamas to the finance department, where he starts to exhibit signs of alcoholism. He eventually is sacked abruptly on rumours he was stealing money from the Circus' accounts to support the small pension he was granted by his superiors, and is forced to go on the dole. Eventually he takes a job in a small run-down library, whilst living in a low quality flat. Whilst there, he meets Liz Gold, the secretary of her local Communist Party of Great Britain branch, and the two gradually strike up a friendship, and eventually become lovers. After a period of illness reveals the extent of Liz's feelings for him, Leamas confides in her that a day is coming where he will say goodbye and she must not look for him. A few days later, he says goodbye, and takes the "final plunge" into Control's plan, getting arrested for assault and sentenced to three months in prison. Before fully involving himself in the scheme, he makes Control promise to leave Liz alone and out of the remit of the Circus.

Upon his release, Leamas is approached by an East German recruiter who claims to know him from his time in Berlin. He lets him stay at his home, and introduces him to a contact who takes him across to the Netherlands on a faked passport. Whilst there, an intelligence agent from the East interviews him deeply on his past in the Circus at a safe house in the Netherlands, before then taking him across into East Germany and gradually meeting more senior officials of the Abteilung, all the while dropping occasional hints about payments to a potential double agent. Whilst this occurs, Liz is suddenly visited by the retired Circus agent George Smiley, who tells her to come to him should she need anything, enquires about her relationship with Leamas, and pays off the outstanding rent on Leamas' flat.

Now in East Germany, Leamas is finally introduced to Fiedler, where he is held under guard in a sparsely decorated home in the middle of nowhere. His days consist largely of extended discussion about his past Circus work, combined with walking in the local countryside and hills with Fiedler or a guard. The two men often end up in philosophical debate, particularly on the topic of Leamas' more pragmatic view of life in comparison to Fiedler's idealist ideological views about life in East Germany. These conversations reveal what Leamas observes as a fear about both the righteousness of Fiedler's motivations, as well as the morality of what he does for his country. In contrast, Mundt is a brutal opportunist, also mercenary-like in manner, who left the Nazis after the war out of convenience and joined the Communists. Fiedler also notes his suspicions about Mundt as the men get closer, and Fiedler conveys his fears about Mundt's anti-semitism affecting him, a Jewish man.

Towards the end of Leamas' tenure in interrogation with Fiedler, the extent of the power struggle in the Abteilung is exposed when Mundt abruptly arrests Fiedler and Leamas. In the panic Leamas inadvertently kills an East German guard, and awakes in Mundt's facility, where Mundt interrogates and tortures both men. It is then revealed, however, that Fiedler had also submitted an arrest warrant for Mundt, leading the East German régime to intervene and convene a court. Fiedler and Mundt are both released, and then summoned to present their cases to a tribunal convened in camera. During the trial, Leamas further elaborates on previous mentions of undercover payments to a foreign agent in bank accounts which match locations that Mundt had travelled to, whilst Fiedler presents other evidence implicating Mundt to be a British agent.

Whilst Leamas is away, Liz receives an invitation from the East Germans to participate in an exchange of party members with the British Communist Party. Surprisingly, she is summoned by Mundt's attorney as a witness and forced to testify at the tribunal. She then admits Smiley paid the apartment lease, and that Smiley offered help should she need it. She also confesses that Leamas made her promise not to look for him, and that he said goodbye immediately before he assaulted the grocer. Leamas, realising his cover has been blown, offers to tell them about the mission in exchange for Liz's freedom, but realises the true nature of the scheme during the course of the tribunal. Fiedler is then arrested at the tribunal's end.

Immediately after the trial, Mundt subtly locates and then releases Leamas and Liz from jail, and gives them a car to get from their current location to the Berlin Wall. During the drive, Leamas explains the entire situation to a bemused Liz. Mundt is actually a British double agent, who reports to Smiley, who is actually undercover in the mission and pretending to be retired. Mundt was turned against the East Germans before he returned following the murder of Samuel Fennan a few years earlier, and the mission's true target was Fiedler, who was closing on exposing Mundt as a double agent. On account of Leamas and Liz's intimate relationship, however, Mundt (and Smiley) were provided with the means of discrediting Leamas' ability to provide evidence to the tribunal, and as such discredit Fiedler. Liz, however, is shaken, and realises that to her horror, her actions have enabled the Circus to protect their asset Mundt at the expense of the thoughtful and idealistic Fiedler. When asked what will become of Fiedler, Leamas replies that he will most likely be shot.

Although disgusted, Liz overcomes this on account of her love for Leamas. The two drive to the Berlin wall, and make a break for West Germany by ascending over the wall and through a section of sabotaged barbed wire atop the wall. Leamas reaches the top, but as he reaches down to help Liz, she is shot and killed by one of Mundt's operatives. She falls back down, and as Smiley calls to Leamas from the other side of the wall, he hesitates, before eventually descending the wall on the East German side to die.

Characters
 Alec Leamas: A British field agent in charge of East German espionage
 Hans-Dieter Mundt: Leader of the East German Secret Service, the Abteilung
 Jens Fiedler: East German spy, and Mundt's deputy
 Liz Gold: English librarian and member of the Communist Party
 Control: Head of The Circus
 George Smiley: British spy, supposedly retired
 Peter Guillam: British spy
 Karl Riemeck: East German bureaucrat turned British spy

Cultural impact
At its publication during the Cold War, the moral presentation of The Spy Who Came In from the Cold rendered it a revolutionary espionage novel by showing the intelligence services of both the Eastern and Western nations as engaging in the same expedient amorality in the name of national security. Le Carré also presented his western spy as a morally burnt-out case.

The espionage world of Alec Leamas portrays love as a three-dimensional emotion that can have disastrous consequences for those involved. Good does not always vanquish evil in Leamas's world, a defeatist attitude that was criticised in The Times.

In 1990, the Crime Writer's Association ranked the novel third in their list The Top 100 Crime Novels of All Time. Five years later in a similar list by Mystery Writers of America the novel was ranked sixth. Time magazine, while including The Spy Who Came In from the Cold in its top 100 novels list, stated that the novel was "a sad, sympathetic portrait of a man who has lived by lies and subterfuge for so long, he's forgotten how to tell the truth." The book also headed the Publishers Weeklys list of 15 top spy novels in 2006.

Writing in The Telegraph, spy writer Jon Stock wrote: "The plot of The Spy Who Came In from the Cold is assembled with more precision than a Swiss watch. The heartless way in which Alec Leamas is manipulated; Control's ruthless playing of Mundt and Fiedler; and of course the dramatic ending on the Berlin Wall, immortalised in the film starring Richard Burton. My favourite le Carré, it gets better with each re-read."

Adaptations
In 1965, Martin Ritt directed the film adaptation, with Richard Burton as Leamas, Oskar Werner as Fiedler, and Claire Bloom as Liz/Nan.

Paramount Television and The Ink Factory — who produced television adaptations of Le Carré's The Night Manager and The Little Drummer Girl — are developing a limited series based on The Spy Who Came In from the Cold, with Simon Beaufoy as the writer.<ref>{{cite web|last=Petski|first=Denise|url=https://deadline.com/2016/07/john-le-carre-the-spy-who-came-in-from-the-cold-limited-series-paramount-tv-1201789173|title=John le Carrés 'The Spy Who Came In from the Cold' to Be Developed as Limited Series by Paramount TV & Ink Factory|website=Deadline|date=20 July 2016|access-date=7 January 2017}}</ref> On 14 January 2017, AMC and the BBC joined with The Ink Factory for the series.

Awards and nominations
Le Carré's book won a 1963 Gold Dagger award from the Crime Writers' Association for "Best Crime Novel". Two years later the US edition was awarded the Edgar Award from the Mystery Writers of America for "Best Mystery Novel". It was the first work to win the award for "Best Novel" from both mystery writing organizations. Screenwriters Paul Dehn and Guy Trosper, who adapted the book for the 1965 movie, received an Edgar the following year for "Best Motion Picture Screenplay" for an American movie.

In 2005, the fiftieth anniversary of the Dagger Awards, The Spy Who Came In from the Cold was awarded the "Dagger of Daggers," a one-time award given to the Golden Dagger winner regarded as the stand-out among all fifty winners over the history of the Crime Writers' Association.

Footnotes

External links
 Le Carré describes how he came to write the book (in an article published in The Guardian'' newspaper (April 2013) on the novel's 50th anniversary): "After a decade in the intelligence service, John le Carré's political disgust and personal confusion 'exploded' in The Spy Who Came In from the Cold."

1963 British novels
British crime novels
British novels adapted into films
British spy novels
Cold War spy novels
Edgar Award-winning works
Novels by John le Carré
Novels set in Berlin
Victor Gollancz Ltd books
Novels set in London